Marissa Kurtimah (born May 25, 1994 in Songo, Sierra Leone) is a Sierra Leone-Canadian track and field athlete competing in the sprint events, predominantly the 100m event. Kurtimah fled her country of birth (due to the civil war) in 2002 at 8 years old along with her family. They settled in Guelph, Ontario.

References

1994 births
Living people
Black Canadian female track and field athletes
Canadian female sprinters
Sierra Leonean emigrants to Canada
Sportspeople from Guelph